Aart Vierhouten (born 19 March 1970 in Ermelo, Gelderland) is a Dutch former professional racing cyclist, who last rode for . He competed in the men's individual road race at the 1996 Summer Olympics.

Major results

1993
 1st, Overall, Tour de Liège
 1st, Drielandenomloop
 1st, Internatie Reningelst
 1st, Stage 2, Tour du Hainaut (amateurs)
1994
 1st, Stages 1 & 9, Tour de Wallonie
1996
 1st, Rund um Rhede
 1st, Stage 7, Teleflex Tour
1997
 1st, Stage 2, Rheinland-Pfalz Rundfahrt
 8th, Paris–Tours
 15th, World Road Race Championship
1998
 1st, Aalsmeer
1999
 10th, Paris–Tours
2000
 1st, Groningen - Münster
2003
 3rd, National Derny Championship
2004
 1st, Profronde van Maastricht
 3rd, Stage 20, Giro d'Italia
2006
 1st, Stage 1, Ster Elektrotoer
 1st, Profronde van Fryslan
 3rd, E3 Prijs Vlaanderen
3rd, Madison, 2006 Dutch National Track Championships (together with Kenny van Hummel)
2007
 1st, Zandvoort
2008
 1st, Ronde van Zuid-Friesland

See also
 List of Dutch Olympic cyclists

References

External links

1970 births
Living people
People from Ermelo, Netherlands
Dutch male cyclists
Dutch track cyclists
UCI Road World Championships cyclists for the Netherlands
Cyclists from Gelderland
Olympic cyclists of the Netherlands
Cyclists at the 1996 Summer Olympics
20th-century Dutch people
21st-century Dutch people